The Southern Cone Mesopotamian savanna, also known as the Argentine Mesopotamian grasslands, is a flooded grassland ecoregion of Argentina and southern Paraguay.

Setting

Flora
The ecoregion is covered by a mosaic of seasonally wet habitats, including grasslands, marshes, woodland, and gallery forests.

Fauna
The Mesopotamian savanna is an endemic bird area, with three endemic species, two of which are threatened.

External links

References

Ecoregions of Argentina
Grasslands of Argentina
Flooded grasslands and savannas
Neotropical ecoregions